Rubin & Ed is a 1991 independent buddy comedy film written and directed by Trent Harris. It stars Crispin Glover and Howard Hesseman.

Plot
An eccentric, unsociable young man is forced by his mother to make some friends before she will return his stereo to him. He is joined on a trip through a desert by a pyramid scheme salesman, to assist in finding a location to bury a frozen cat.

Cast
 Howard Hesseman as Ed Tuttle
 Crispin Glover as Rubin Farr
 Karen Black as Rula
 Michael Greene as Mr. Busta
 Brittney Lewis as Poster Girl
 Anna Louise Daniels as Rubin's Mom
 Ray Gordon as Barking Man
 Dorene Nielsen as Ed's Mom

Production

Rubin & Ed was filmed in Utah in Salt Lake City, Hanksville, Factory Butte and Goblin Valley State Park.

Glover's appearance on Late Night
Crispin Glover appeared on Late Night with David Letterman in 1987 to promote the film River's Edge. During the interview, Glover wore platform shoes and a wig, behaved erratically, and nearly kicked David Letterman in the face, causing Letterman to walk off the set. After Rubin & Ed premiered four years later, some speculated that Glover appeared on the show in-character as Rubin Farr.

References

External links
 
 
 

1991 films
1990s buddy comedy films
British buddy films
Films set in Utah
Films shot in Utah
Working Title Films films
1991 comedy films
1990s English-language films
1990s British films